Sias is an unincorporated community in Lincoln County, West Virginia, United States. Sias had a post office, which closed on February 1, 1997.

Tradition has it the name is a corruption of the word "ice", but Hamill Kenny proposes the town instead may be named after the Sias family.

References

Unincorporated communities in Lincoln County, West Virginia
Unincorporated communities in West Virginia